India with Sanjeev Bhaskar is a four-part documentary from the BBC in which Sanjeev Bhaskar travels to India with director Deep Sehgal. The documentary was created as part of the BBC's series of programmes on the 60th anniversary of the independence of India and Pakistan.  The series was broadcast between 30 July and 20 August 2007.

Episode list

International broadcasts
In Australia, this series was broadcast on the Seven Network's free-to-air digital channel 7Two at 7.30pm Saturday nights.

As part of a regular timeslot devoted to British documentaries, the Canadian public television station TVOntario (TVO) has occasionally aired the four-part series.

References

External links

2000s British documentary television series
2007 British television series debuts
2007 British television series endings
BBC television documentaries
British Indian mass media
English-language television shows
Documentary films about India